A penetration, in firestopping, is an opening, such as one created by the use of a cast-in-place sleeve, in a wall or floor assembly required to have a fire-resistance rating, for the purpose of accommodating the passage of a mechanical, electrical or structural penetrant. The penetration may or may not contain a firestop system. A penetration is not a penetrant. A penetration may or may not include a penetrant.

Images

See also

 Sleeve (construction)
 Passive fire protection
 Annulus (firestop)
 Joint (building)
 Penetrant (mechanical, electrical, or structural)
 Mortar (firestop)
 Firestop pillow
 Fire test

External links
 Penetration seals (firestops) treatise by Warrington labs
 Penetration seals (firestops) treatise by Nuclear Regulatory Commission
 Penetration seal (firestop) vendor listings by Thomas Register

Passive fire protection
Building engineering
Firestops